The 1952 Chicago Cubs season was the 81st season of the Chicago Cubs franchise, the 77th in the National League and the 37th at Wrigley Field. The Cubs finished fifth in the National League with a record of 77–77. Starting from this season, WGN was the exclusive television broadcast partner of the Cubs franchise with the transfer of WBKB ownership to CBS.

Offseason 
 October 4, 1951: Smoky Burgess and Bob Borkowski were traded by the Cubs to the Cincinnati Reds for Johnny Pramesa and Bob Usher.
 October 19, 1951: Grant Dunlap was purchased by the Cubs from the Shreveport Sports.
 Prior to 1952 season: Footer Johnson was signed as an amateur free agent by the Cubs.

Regular season

Season standings

Record vs. opponents

Notable transactions 
 May 8, 1952: Grant Dunlap was returned by the Cubs to the Shreveport Sports.

Roster

Player stats

Batting

Starters by position 
Note: Pos = Position; G = Games played; AB = At bats; H = Hits; Avg. = Batting average; HR = Home runs; RBI = Runs batted in

Other batters 
Note: G = Games played; AB = At bats; H = Hits; Avg. = Batting average; HR = Home runs; RBI = Runs batted in

Pitching

Starting pitchers 
Note: G = Games pitched; IP = Innings pitched; W = Wins; L = Losses; ERA = Earned run average; SO = Strikeouts

Other pitchers 
Note: G = Games pitched; IP = Innings pitched; W = Wins; L = Losses; ERA = Earned run average; SO = Strikeouts

Relief pitchers 
Note: G = Games pitched; W = Wins; L = Losses; SV = Saves; ERA = Earned run average; SO = Strikeouts

Farm system

Awards and honors 
Hank Sauer, National League Most Valuable Player
Hank Sauer, National League Home Run Champion (with Ralph Kiner) 
Hank Sauer, National League RBI Champion

Notes

References 

1952 Chicago Cubs season at Baseball Reference

Chicago Cubs seasons
Chicago Cubs season
Chicago Cubs